The Inca Plan was an instrument to rationalize development implemented by the military dictatorship of the self-proclaimed Revolutionary Government of the Armed Forces of Peru, based on the National Planning System. It was led by Juan Velasco Alvarado, then de facto president during the dictatorship, advised by the Committee of Advisory Officials to the Presidency.

It was announced on July 28, 1974, on the occasion of the 153rd anniversary of the independence of Peru.

Goal
Within twenty years, the Inca plan was to achieve "the integration of the population, its distribution throughout the economic space of the country and achieve per capita income no less than the current one." These objectives had to be achieved in a purely Peruvian environment; for this reason the government declared its identity: "Neither capitalist nor Marxist-Leninist." Socialist self-management and, as a form of government, popular democracy were put into practice. In practice, it had an economy in transition to socialism; made efforts to approach communist countries.

Achievements
Under the plan, the following was achieved:
Takeover of Talara (October 9, 1968) and recovery of its oil fields.
Planning and restructuring of the state apparatus.
Central Reserve Bank: regulatory body for national credit.
Strengthening of the Bank of the Nation.
On July 24, 1969, the company Petróleos del Perú was created.
Nationalization of private commercial banking.
On November 2, 1969, the General Mining Law was approved. Then the company Minero Perú was founded.

See also
Vuskovic plan

References

Revolutionary Government of the Armed Forces of Peru
1974 in Peru
1975 in Peru